The Whitehorse Formation is a geologic formation of Late Triassic age. It is present on the western edge of the Western Canada Sedimentary Basin in western Alberta and northeastern British Columbia. It was first described as a member of the Spray River Formation by P.S. Warren in 1945, who named it for Whitehorse Creek, a tributary of the McLeod River south of Cadomin, Alberta. It was later raised to formation status.

Marine fossils from the Late Triassic epoch including crinoids, brachiopods, bivalves, and gastropods, have been found in the Whitehorse Formation.

Lithology and stratigraphy
The Whitehorse Formation was deposited on the continental shelf along the western margin of the North American craton. It consists of dolomite, limestone, quartzose sandstone, and siltstone, with minor gypsum.

The Whitehorse Formation is subdivided into the following members:

Distribution and relationship to other units
The Whitehorse Formation is present in the Rocky Mountains and their foothills from the Canada–United States border in Alberta to the Sukunka River area of northeastern British Columbia. It is disconformably overlain by the Jurassic Fernie Formation and conformably underlain by the Sulphur Mountain Formation. It is correlative with the Charlie Lake, Ludington, Baldonnel and lower Pardonet Formations and, in the subsurface of northeastern British Columbia, the Schooler Creek Group.

Economic resources

Gypsum
Although localized deposits of gypsum are present in the Starlight Evaporite Member, they lie within  Jasper National Park and are protected from development.

References

Geologic formations of Canada
Western Canadian Sedimentary Basin
Stratigraphy of Alberta
Stratigraphy of British Columbia
Triassic Alberta
Triassic British Columbia
Triassic System of North America
Upper Triassic Series